Emmiltis is a monotypic moth genus in the family Geometridae. Its only species is Emmiltis pygmaearia. Both the genus and species were first described by Jacob Hübner, the genus in 1825 and the species in 1809.

Etymology
The species name pygmaearia comes from the Latin pygmaeus meaning dwarf, because it is one of the smallest species.

Distribution and habitat
Emmiltis pygmaearia is present in southeastern Europe (Croatia, France, Italy, Slovenia and Switzerland).

Description
The basic color of these uncommon small moths varies from light brown to ocher, The forewings and the hindwings are crossed by three whitish wavy lines, with a darker border. Along the fringed checkered edge of the wings runs a thin line of brown. In this species the sexes are dimorphic. In fact in the males only the antennae are comb-like and it is much more evident the brown area near the internal corner of the rear wings.

Biology
This species has two generations a year (biivoltine). Adults are active during the day in May-June and in July-August. In Summer caterpillars feed on flowers of lower plants (mainly Fabaceae and Caryophyllaceae) (Cerastium tomentosum, Lotus corniculatus, Ononis spinosa, Stellaria holostea, Stellaria media, Taraxacum officinale). From autumn they hibernate on dry leaves of the host plants and after overwintering they live on the withered leaves.

External links
 Lepiforum 
 Paolo Mazzei, Daniel Morel, Raniero Panfili Moths and Butterflies of Europe and North Africa

Bibliography
Hübner, J. [1790-1833]: Sammlung europäischer Schmetterlinge 5: pl. 1-113.

References

Sterrhini
Monotypic moth genera